Whirlpool is the fourth album by Some Velvet Sidewalk.

Track listing
"Whirlpool"
"Mouse & Rat"
"Oscar Says"
"One Bear Alone"
"Big City Plans"
"How Will I?"
"I Blame You"
"Shame"
"Geological"
"Kicking: Giant"

Credits
Some Velvet Sidewalk
Al Larsen - vocals & guitar
Martin Bernier - bass
Don Blair - drums

Guests
Robin Boomer (cello on "Oscar Says")
Steve Fisk (organ on "Big City Plans")
Steve McGraph (trumpet on "Big City Plans")

References

1994 albums
Albums produced by Steve Fisk
K Records albums
Some Velvet Sidewalk albums